Plasmodium lophurae is a parasite of the genus Plasmodium subgenus Giovannolaia.

Like all Plasmodium species, P. lophurae has both vertebrate and insect hosts. The vertebrate hosts for this parasite are birds.

Description 
The parasite was first described by Coggeshall in 1938 after being isolated from chickens. Adult chickens demonstrate resistance to this parasite.

Distribution 
P. lophurae was discovered in Sri Lanka and is endemic to the Southeast Asia region.

Description 
P. lophurae can be isolated from a blood smear.

References 

lophurae
Parasites of birds